Nazariy Olehovych Nych (born 19 February 1999) is a Ukrainian professional footballer who plays as forward for LNZ Cherkasy.

Career
Nych is a product of the different youth systems around Lviv. He began his career at the amateur level until July 2017, when signed a contract with FC Volyn Lutsk in the Ukrainian First League.

In February 2019 he signed a contract with the Ukrainian Premier League team FC Lviv. He made his league debut for FC Lviv as a substitute against FC Kolos Kovalivka on 14 December 2019.

References

External links
 
 
 

1999 births
Living people
Ukrainian footballers
Association football forwards
NK Veres Rivne players
FC Volyn Lutsk players
FC Lviv players
FC LNZ Cherkasy players
Ukrainian Premier League players
Ukrainian First League players
Sportspeople from Lviv Oblast